This is a page of data for apomorphine.

References

         

Chemical data pages
Chemical data pages cleanup